Stadium of São Miguel is a large open-air stadium in the municipality of Ponta Delgada in the Portuguese archipelago of the Azores. It is used mostly for national and regional football matches, and official home stadium of Santa Clara.

History
The stadium was completed in 1930, with the first football match scheduled for sometime that season.

The stadium is UEFA approved, able to compete in either UEFA Champions League and UEFA Europa League, and is home of the Azorean regional football team. The Portugal national team has played in the stadium matches, the last being aa friendly 2–0 win over Egypt, to a sold-out crowd). 

Renovations to the stadium occurred in the 2008–2009 season, with improved lighting, remodelled seating, new turf and improvements to the rest areas. Renovations and expenditures were also slated for the 2013–2014, that included: improvements and interventions in the lighting towers and requalification of the exterior spaces of the stadium, respectively.

Architecture
The  stadium holds approximately 13,200 spectators.

References

Notes

Sources

 

 Azores
Buildings and structures in Ponta Delgada
Sports venues completed in 1930